V. Muthuraja is an Indian politician who is a Member of Legislative Assembly of Tamil Nadu. He was elected from Pudukkottai as an Dravida Munnetra Kazhagam candidate in 2021.

Elections contested

References 

Tamil Nadu MLAs 2021–2026
Living people
Dravida Munnetra Kazhagam politicians
Year of birth missing (living people)